Cyriaque Rivieyran (born 17 April 1991) is a retired French professional footballer who played as a defensive midfielder. Rivieyran is a France youth international having represented his nation at under-16 and under-19 level.

Career
Born in Strasbourg, Rivieyran joined RC Strasbourg in 2001 after spending four years playing with clubs in the Alsace region. While playing in Strasbourg's youth academy, he won two Coupe d'Alsace titles in 2008 and 2010. He was rewarded with a spot on the club's senior team at the start of the 2010–11 season and made his club debut on 20 August 2010 in a league match against Guingamp appearing as a substitute in a 0–0 draw. Rivieyran made his first career start in a 12 March 2011 in a 2–0 win over Plabennec.

Rivieyran moved on a free transfer at the end of the 2014–15 season from newly promoted Gazélec Ajaccio to Clermont Foot.

On 28 October 2019, 28-year old Rivieyran announced that he had retired from football.

Career statistics

Notes

References

External links
 Player profile at racingstub.com
 

1991 births
Living people
Footballers from Strasbourg
Association football midfielders
Association football fullbacks
French footballers
France youth international footballers
RC Strasbourg Alsace players
AJ Auxerre players
Gazélec Ajaccio players
Clermont Foot players
Ligue 2 players
Ligue 1 players
Championnat National players